Alexander House (also known as Alexander Music House) is a historic house located at 319 East Main Street in Spartanburg, Spartanburg County, South Carolina.

Description and history 
It was built in 1904 and is a two-story, wood-framed and weatherboard house in the Neo-Classical style. The front facade features a full-height entry porch with lower full-width porch. In 1969, the house was renovated and converted for use as a musical instruments store.

It was listed on the National Register of Historic Places on April 11, 2003.

References

Houses on the National Register of Historic Places in South Carolina
Neoclassical architecture in South Carolina
Houses completed in 1904
Houses in Spartanburg, South Carolina
National Register of Historic Places in Spartanburg, South Carolina